The Portrait of a Woman with Mask is a pastel painting by the Venetian artist Rosalba Carriera, completed between 1720 and 1730, and currently in the collection of the Palazzo Melzi d'Eril, Milan.

Description
The portrait is painted in pastels, by Rosalba Carriera. Its year of completion is unknown, but its provenance can be traced back from the Galleria Lorenzelli in Bergamo where it is documented by a label on the back of the portrait and an approximate drawn up in Italian lire by the Sotheby's without a detailed year. The portrait appears in the inventory from Intesa Leasing and merged into Fondazione Cariplo's collection in 1999.

The year of execution is approximately assumed during after the artist's trip to Paris in 1720. The woman wears a band of pearls around her arm with a precious blue stone, and holds a venetian moretta in her right hand, and a fine ribbon on her neck and a charming flower clumping her hair. Her pale dress indicates the influence of Classicism and allegorical representation of a pagan goddess. The portrait is currently in the collection of the Palazzo Melzi d'Eril, Milan.

References

Bibliography
 Neil Jeffares, Charles-Antoine Coypel, in Dictionary of pastellists before 1800, introduction by P. Rosenberg, London, 2006, p. 147, ill., updated on 23 May 2017
 Elena Lissoni and Lucia Molino, edited by, The gentle soul. Art and life from Giovanni Agostino da Lodi to Vincenzo Irolli, exhibition catalog, Lodi, Palazzo Barni, 24 November 2017 – 31 January 2018, Silvana Editoriale, Cinisello Balsamo, 2017, n. 24, pp. 80–81
 Renata Casarin and Lucia Molino, edited by, Fate and destiny. Between myth and contemporaneity, exhibition catalog, Mantua, Palazzo Ducale Museum Complex, Appartamento della Rustica, 8 September 2018 – 6 January 2019, Silvana Editoriale, Cinisello Balsamo, 2018, n. 4, pp. 38–39

Sources
 Cariplo Foundation Archive, fald. Purchase of Intesa Leasing works

1720s paintings
Italian paintings
Portraits of women